James Gregory Hibbard (born September 13, 1964) is an American former professional baseball pitcher who played in the Major League Baseball (MLB) from –.

Career

Houston Astros
Hibbard was originally drafted by the Astros out of Harrison Central High School (Mississippi) in the 8th round of the 1984 draft. He decided, instead, to attend the University of Alabama and did not sign with the team.

Kansas City Royals
The Royals drafted Hibbard out of the University of Alabama in the 16th round of the 1986 draft. They later traded him with Chuck Mount, John Davis, and Melido Perez to the White Sox for Floyd Banister and Dave Cochrane.

Chicago White Sox
From 1989 to 1992, he compiled a 41–34 record with the club. His best season came in 1990, when he went 14–9 with a 3.16 ERA. Impressively, despite winning all those games and throwing 211 innings, he struck out just 92 batters. Hibbard only made 6 relief appearances as a White Sox, but did pick up his one and only career save. On August 1, 1992, Hibbard threw 4 shutout innings to nail down a 8-1 White Sox win over the Mariners and saving the win for starting pitcher Kirk McCaskill.

Florida Marlins
In 1992, the Marlins selected Hibbard with the 12th pick in the expansion draft. He did not last long in Florida, as they traded him that same day to the Cubs for Alex Arias and Gary Scott.

Chicago Cubs
Hibbard went on to pitch for the Cubs. In his lone season with the club, he finished with a 15–11 record, which earned him a 3-year deal with the Seattle Mariners.

Seattle Mariners
Hibbard received a 3-year deal with the Mariners. His first season with the club was cut short due to a shoulder issue. He finished that season 1-5 and a whopping 6.69 ERA. Hibbard would go on to never pitch for the M's again as the chronic shoulder issues kept him from ever being the same. He officially retired from baseball in 1997.

References

External links

1964 births
Living people
Alabama Crimson Tide baseball players
American expatriate baseball players in Canada
Appleton Foxes players
Baseball coaches from Louisiana
Baseball players from New Orleans
Chicago White Sox players
Chicago Cubs players
Eugene Emeralds players
Fort Myers Royals players
Major League Baseball pitchers
Memphis Chicks players
Mississippi Gulf Coast Bulldogs baseball players
Seattle Mariners players
Vancouver Canadians players